Józef Karol Cornobis (28 June 1880 – 1939 or 1940) was a Polish theatre actor and director. He was killed during the Second World War; he either was shot by German troops in Toruń in 1939 or murdered in Auschwitz concentration camp.

References

External links

1880 births
1939 deaths
1940 deaths
People from Konin County
Polish male stage actors
19th-century Polish male actors
20th-century Polish male actors
Polish civilians killed in World War II
Polish people who died in Auschwitz concentration camp
Deaths by firearm in Poland
People executed by Nazi Germany by firearm
Polish people executed by Nazi Germany
Polish male film actors
Polish theatre directors